Isaiah Bakish ( c. 1545 – c. 1620  1580s – 1620s) was a rabbi of spanish descent.

He was dayan (judge) in the Beth Din (rabbinical court) of Fez. His writings deal with takkanot (sing. takkanah), exegesis and kabbalah.

The Kabbalist
Kabbalistic writings of Bakish were included in manuscript compilations containing also quotes from famous Kabbalists such as: Nahmanides (Ramban, R’ Moshe ben Nahman Gerondi); Rabbi Isaac Luria (R’ Ari zal); Rabbi Hayyim ben Joseph Vital; R’ Abraham Azulai. The microfilmed collections of the National Library of Israel in Jerusalem contain several of these manuscripts or microfilm manuscripts from other libraries.

In his work on Kabbalah in North Africa since the 16th c., Moshé Hallamish mentioned Isaiah Bakish.
In his Shorshei Hashemot the Italian Kabbalist Moses ben Mordecai Zacuto included long quotations of the  R' Isaiah Bakish (16-17th c.).

Works
 פסקי דינים ושו״ת Piskei dinim wéchout (sheelot vé tchouvot, c. 1610).
 קטעים Fragments (1992).

Bibliography
 (heb.) Natanel Avital (2016-7/5777), 'Hakhmey Castilla, 417 p, Maguen Avot, Jérusalem, pp. 20; 25; 32.
 (fr.) Hillel Bakis,Rabbi Ichaya Bakish. Un rabbin-juge marocain (16e-17e siècles), p. 1-40; in Ichaya Bakish, Fragments, 132 p., Editions Bakish, imprimé à Kiriat Ata, Israël, 1992.
 (fr.) Hillel Bakis,Interpréter la Torah. Traditions et méthodes rabbiniques, p. 139-140 et 253, Institut R' Yésha'ya Bakish, Editions Bakish, Montpellier, 2013. 294 p.
 (fr.) Hillel Bakis, Pour lire les Psaumes. Etude de l’Alphabéta (Ps. 119). Texte. Phonétique et rythme. Nouvelle traduction. Commentaires. Abrégé grammatical', see p. 36, 37, 71, 86, 212, 161 (Editions Bakish, X-294 p., Montpellier, 2014).
 (fr./heb.) Hillel Bakis, Traces manuscrites de l'œuvre de Rabbi Yesha'ya Bakish זצ"ל : un des premiers A'haronim parmi les Sages de Castille au Maroc (v. 1545-v. 1620), ebook, Institut Rabbi Yécha'ya, Editions Bakish, 602 pages, 2020, décembre.
 (fr./heb.) Hillel Bakis, Traces imprimées de l'œuvre de Rabbi Yesha'ya Bakish זצ"ל : un des premiers A'haronim parmi les Sages de Castille au Maroc (v. 1545-v. 1620), ebook, Institut Rabbi Yécha'ya, Editions Bakish, 476 pages, 3e éd. Avril 2021.
 (fr./heb.) Hillel Bakis, Traces digitales de l'œuvre de Rabbi Yesha'ya Bakish זצ"ל : un des premiers A'haronim parmi les Sages de Castille au Maroc (v. 1545-v. 1620), ebook, Institut Rabbi Yécha'ya, Editions Bakish, 352 pages, Juin 2021.
 (heb.) Yossef Ben Naïm, R', Sépher malké rabbanan, Jérusalem, 1931. p. 62, 79.
 (fr.) Arrik Delouya, Les Juifs du Maroc: bibliographie générale : résumés, annotations, recensions. Librairie orientaliste Paul Geuthner, Paris, 2001.
 (heb.) Moshé Hallamish, חלמיש, משה - הקבלה בצפון אפריקה למן המאה הט"ז : סקירה היסטורית ותר, Tel-Aviv, Hakibbutz Haméouhad, 2001 (see p. 43 ; 119; 184–185).
 (es.) Abraham I. Larédo, 'Las Taqanot de los expulsados de Castiila en Marruccosy su régimen matrimonial y sucesoral', in Sefarad, pp. 243–276; instituto Arias Montano, Madrid-Barcelona, 1948.
 (heb.) David Obadia, R', Fès vehachmia, Kronikot Mkoriot, Jérusalem, 1978–1979.
 (heb.) Chim’on Ouanonou, Erez Halébanone, vol. 3, p. 1357, 1999.
 D. S. Sasoon & David Ohel, Descriptive catalogue of the Hebrew and Samaritan manuscripts in the Sassoon Library. Oxford, 1932, 2 vols
 (heb.) Ya'akob Moshé Toledano, R', Ner ha ma’arabi, Jérusalem, 1911. see p. 74, 75 et 104.
 (fr.) Haïm Zafrani, Les Juifs du Maroc. Vie sociale, économique et religieuse. Études de Taqqanot et Responsa'', Geuthner, Paris, 332 p, 1972.

References

External links
http://editionsbakish.com/node/86; http://editionsbakish.com/node/250

Kabbalists
16th-century births
17th-century deaths
Year of birth unknown
Year of death unknown
16th-century Spanish rabbis
16th-century Moroccan rabbis
17th-century Moroccan rabbis